Rainbow Lake is a five-acre lake located in Waterford Township, Michigan. It lies west of Dixie Highway and east of Airport Rd.  The 15-ft deep, spring fed private lake is next to Our Lady of the Lakes school.

Fish
Rainbow Lake fish include Crappie and Bluegill.

References

Lakes of Oakland County, Michigan
Lakes of Michigan
Lakes of Waterford Township, Michigan